Troides cuneifera, the Mountain Birdwing, is a large butterfly belonging to the swallowtail family, Papilionidae, found in the Thai-Malay Peninsula, Sumatra, Java and Borneo.

Being very similar to Troides amphrysus, the butterfly was originally described as Ornithoptera amphrisius var. cuneifera. The first to separate the two species was Pieter Cornelius Tobias Snellen in 1889. The species is in decline in Sumatra and Java due to human activities such as increased cultivation.

Troides cuneifera tantalus remains one of the great mysteries of the birdwings. The taxon is known from only one male and one female. When described, the specimens were claimed to originate from Kala Bula Hills or Kala Bala Hills, north Borneo.

Description

Troides cuneifera is sexually dimorphic.

Male: The forewings are ground colour black. There are some yellow postdiscal stripes which may be faint. The underside of the forewings is very similar. The hindwings are golden yellow. The veins and the edge of the wing are black. There is a chain of post discal black spots. The underside of the hindwings is very similar.

The abdomen is light brown and has two black spots. The underside of the abdomen is yellow. The head and thorax are black.

Female: The female is larger than the male. The wing ground colour is dark brown. The veins are bordered by white shading. There is a golden-yellow area with dark veins on the hindwings. At the outer edge there is a marginal chain of yellow spots. The underside is very similar.

Biology
The larval food plant is a species of Aristolochia, A. foveolata.

Subspecies
Troides cuneifera cuneifera Java.
Troides cuneifera paeninsulae (Pendlebury, 1936) Malaysia
Troides cuneifera sumatranus (Hagen, 1894) Sumatra
Troides cuneifera tantalus Ehrmann, 1904 North Borneo, known from only one male and one female

Biogeographic realm
Indomalayan realm.

Related species
Troides cuneifera is a member of the Troides amphrysus species group. The members of this clade are:

Troides amphrysus (Cramer, [1779])
Troides andromache (Staudinger, 1892)
Troides cuneifera (Oberthür, 1879)
Troides miranda (Butler, 1869)

References

Gabriel, Alfred George (1941) The superficial differences between Troides cuneifera Oberthür and Troides amphrysus Cramer. Entomologist 74, pp. [203-204]
 Haugum, J. & Low, A.M. (1983). A Monograph of the Birdwing Butterflies. The systematics of Ornithoptera,Troides and related genera. Vol. 2, Part 2. Troides; amphrysus and haliphron groups. Klampenborg, Denmark: Scandinavian Science Press pp. 105–204

D'Abrera, B. (1975) Birdwing Butterflies of the World. Country Life Books, London.
Other literature at Troides

External links

Ngypal
Butterflycorner Images from Naturhistorisches Museum Wien (English/German)
Indomalaysian Tropical and subtropical moist broadleaf forests Ecoregion
Kurt Rumbucher,Béla von Knötgen and Oliver Schäffler, Knötgen 1999 Part 7, Papilionidae IV. Troides II., amphrysus-group in Erich Bauer and Thomas Frankenbach Eds. Butterflies of the World. Keltern: Goecke & Evers  .

Cuneifera
Butterflies of Indochina
Butterflies of Borneo
Butterflies of Indonesia
Butterflies of Java
Butterflies described in 1879